The Upanishadic philosophy of experience expounded by Gaudapada is based on the cryptic references made by the sage of the Mandukya Upanishad to the experience of the individual self of its own apparent manifestations in the three fundamental states of consciousness, and to the Fourth known as Turiya. Turiya is identified with “that goal which all the Vedas declare” - सर्वे वेदा यत् पदमानन्ति (Katha Upanishad I.ii.15), and whose characteristics are not dissimilar to those of the non-dual Brahman (Mandukya Upanishad 7).

Background
Philosophy, according to Gaudapada and Adi Sankara, is an interpretation of the totality of human experience (bhoga) or of the whole of life from the standpoint of truth, and the object it seeks is the happiness (sukham) and welfare (hitam) of all beings (sarva sattva) in this world (ihaiva). Experience is participation in an event or connecting with a product of one's own activities; an individual creates the world of his own experiences (dristisristivada). Rishi Kutsa Angirasa (Rig Veda I.102.2) draws attention to the fact that no happiness can be derived as relating to the material world of objects without knowing each of the constituents of creation endowed with name, form and colour that have made all objects of faith and devotion. Rishi Kakshivan (Rig Veda I.116.11) points out the subtlety involved in these matters consisting in the fact that the happiness experienced or to be experienced is in the mind and not in the object of faith or pleasure. Participation involves work (effort) and knowledge. Therefore, a Rishi of the Rig Veda prays:-
 आ त्वां विश्न्त्वाशवः सोमास इन्द्र गिर्वणः |
 शन्ते सन्तु प्रचेतसे || (R.V. I.v.7)
 "May the objects possessed of active qualities required for accomplishing various aims and gains or results prove beneficial to those learned ones who are the doers of praise-worthy deeds, who factually know the objects as to their qualities, means or utility, and their scope."
Here, the Rishi refers to the experiencing of things (active qualities) and inevitable consequences (beneficial results), and also to the mental modes (factually know) . In a mantra (Rig Veda I.164.32),
 य ईं चकार न सो अस्य वेद य ईं ददर्श हिरुगिन्नु तस्मात् |
 स मातुर्योना परिवीतो अन्तर्बहुप्रजा निर्ऋतिमा विवेश ||
Rishi Dirghatamas tells us that he who is engaged in works alone does not know his own form, but he who does and sees actions and knows his form, nature etc., is different who remaining different re-enters protectively in his mother's womb returns to earth and re-engages again and again in auspicious works and actions. In this manner the Rishi speaks of two distinct experiences – one which is yet to be experienced and the other which is already being experienced repeatedly; the experience which is yet to be experienced is what the Creator does, who creates for creation sake without being concerned about the results of his actions because His actions do not bind Him to anything, who continues to behave as though He is not aware of anything else.

The ancient concept of Ṛta expresses the idea of a regulative principle in nature and human society; the cosmic energies (Devas), hostile forces (Asuras) and different spirits (Gandharvas and Apsaras), all are subject to Rta. All actions contribute to maintaining the cosmic order in balance through liturgy; the cosmic order is the manifestation of the Ultimate Reality (Brahman) which is Truth (Satya). The Rig Veda (X.85.1-2) celebrates the relationship between truth and cosmic law (Ṛta). The Rig Veda (VII.56.12) also gives the equation of cosmic law (Ṛta) and truth (Satya), it was by observing the cosmic law the rishis reached the truth. Satya signifies that which is eternal, the supreme, Existence in its own form Sat; rtam signifies that which is evident or perceptible, manifested out of the satya, what has come to be in accordance with satya or that which represents satya.
  
The entire philosophy of the Upanishads, is based on the direct experience of the Vedic people; it is concerned with that knowledge which is common to all experience, everywhere, and not only to some specialized exclusive area of experience. Gaudapada, who rediscovered the Philosophy of Experience and wrote his Karika on the Mandukya Upanishad, too emphasises upon the impossibility of reaching the highest truth unless the totality of human experience or knowledge are taken into consideration and that the experiences in the waking state are required to be matched with the experiences in the other states of consciousness so that the individual inquiry is extended to the possible source of all consciousness.

Gaudapada’s interpretation of Maya
Ajativada, doctrine that there is no birth or production of substantial or fully real things anywhere or at any time, and therefore no real objective world outside consciousness, is central to Gaudapada who holds that all sensory and mental experience, except the experience of content-less consciousness, is illusion or Maya, which doctrine of Maya is in conformity with the Vedantic reaches and conclusions regarding the sole ever-existing eternal real entity (paramarthatah), Brahman, which has nothing different from it, and none whatever outside it (advaita), whose reality can be known ('experienced') through the cultivated meditative experience of non-dual consciousness. He maintains the doctrine that the universe was not created at all but takes some cognisance at least of the world as real, though it may be for the perfection of mystical endeavour or ethical conduct even though, philosophically, he may regard it as not having been created at all.

Gaudapada’s concept of experience
Brihadaranyaka Upanishad (II.iii.4-5) tells us that the essence of that which is gross, mortal, limited and defined is the eye, which means that the mental mode associated with comparison is connected with the eye which perceives things and qualities and gives rise to duality and multiplicity i.e. separateness; the eye is the Sun which is the defined but the defined is that which moves within the eye. Gaudapada explores the transcendences by the Self of the three states detailed by the Upanishads and speaks about Vaishvanara, the all-pervading and met with the eye, experiencing the external things; Taijasa which is inside the mind, as experiencing the inner things and Prajna is the mass of consciousness in the space within the heart, all three interlinked by memory as "I". In this context, Sankara explains that on cessation of the activity called memory Prajna becomes free from diversity and there is no functioning of the mind; perception and recollection are merely vibrations of the mind; in the absence of these there is merely existence of an un-manifested state in the heart. Therefore, the indescribable state of Turiya, is neither a void nor an unreal illusion without a substratum, and is held to be the all-pervasive source of all entities. Vaishvanara and Taijasa are held to be conditioned by cause and effect; Prajna is conditioned by cause, but cause and effect do not exist in Turiya. Cause and effect spring into being so long as there is mental preoccupation with cause and effect; there is no origination of cause and effect when engrossment with cause and effect becomes attenuated. As long as there is mental preoccupation with causality so long does the worldly state continue; when engrossment with causality is exhausted, one does not attain the worldly state. Everything seems to be born because of the empirical outlook; therefore there is nothing eternal; from the standpoint of Reality, everything is the birthless Self; therefore there is no such thing as annihilation (Karika VI.55-57).

Apparent manifestations of the self
Gaudapada begins with the three apparent manifestations of the self – 1) as the 'experiencer' of the external world in the Waking state (visva or Vaishvanara atman), 2) as the 'experiencer' in the Dream state (Taijasa atman) and as the 'experiencer' in Deep sleep state or susupti (Prajna) when there is no determinate knowledge, but pure consciousness and pure bliss or ananda; the person who knows these three as one is never attached to these experiences. He also describes the Fourth state of the self (Turiya) which is advaita ('non-dual') and the All. In the Waking state things are imagined as if existing outside, and in the Dream state, things are imagined internally, both of them are illusory creations of the self; truth is that reality which is perceived as the imagination-less cessation of all appearances (nirvikalpah prapancopasamah). The thing that has beginning and an end is false; the existing of things is illusory; things exist only as far as they merely appear or are related to experience and as merely thoughts with which fools are deluded.

Gaudapada’s examination of the experience of the experiencing self
Gaudapada points out that the unchangeable reality is the witness behind the three states of consciousness, waking, dreaming, and dreamless sleep, in all these states the Self is ever-present, and though remaining unknown is the unaffected 'experiencer' of all actions and thoughts in these three states. In deep sleep the mind is withdrawn and does not know anything, but it is disciplined and not withdrawn in turiya, existent and all-seeing. When the individual self, sleeping under the influence of maya ('ignorance'), is awakened, it then realizes non-duality which is beginning-less and endless; this is the way to illumination within one's own soul to realize supreme bliss. Gaudapada insists that the mind should not be allowed to enjoy the bliss that arises out of the condition of absorption. It should be freed from attachment to such happiness through the exercise of discrimination. When the mind does not lose itself in inactivity and oblivion, or is not distracted by desires, when the mind achieves quietness and does not give rise to appearances, it verily becomes Brahman. The waking and the dreaming states are equally real and equally unreal, real only in relative sense and unreal as compared with the transcendental in which there is identification with Reality, the unchangeable Self. There is no absolute reality of creation, the one infinite Existence appears to be the manifold universe which universe is not a reality but something superimposed upon the Atman. Bondage and liberation, the individual soul and the world, are all unreal. The supreme bliss is the very nature of the Atman, an absolute reality which persists.

Patanjali’s concept of experience
Patanjali tells us that experiences of pleasure and pain are the fruits of merit and demerit, respectively; pain is caused by false identification of the experiencer with the object of experience, and the pain which is yet to come may be avoided. The "experiencer" is the Atman, the real human nature, and the "object of experience" is the totality of the apparent world, including the mind and the senses; so long as the experiencer is falsely identified with the object of experience the Atman cannot be known. Patanjali states – अभाव – प्रत्ययालम्बना वृत्तिर्निद्रा (Yoga Sutra I.10) that "sleep is a wave of thought about nothingness", which means sleep is a positive experience of nothingness, when the already perceived objects are not forgotten but as experiences unite themselves to the system which existed at the time of going to sleep, in that state there is continuity of experience and the function of remembering is not reduced to utter confusion. He explains that the mind having innumerable impressions and desires acts only to serve the Atman and is able to perceive because it reflects both the Atman and the objects of perception, it cannot act independently for its own sake. The man of discrimination ceases to regard the mind as the Atman, and moves towards liberation. Distractions due to past impressions may arise if the mind relaxes its discrimination, even a little but can be overcome in the same manner as obstacles to enlightenment, that is, by resolving the mind back into its primal cause through meditation.

Patanjali tells us – तस्य सप्तधा प्रान्तभूमिः प्रज्ञा (Yoga Sutras II.27) that the experiencer gains the knowledge of the Atman in seven stages, advancing towards the highest beginning with - a) the realization that the source of all spiritual wisdom is inside us, and proceeding to b) when attachments and aversions lose their power, to c) complete realization of, and union with the Atman when the objective universe disappears, to d) when the man of illumination no longer identifies the external world with the Atman, to e) when the mind and the objective world ends their services to the experiencer, to f) when the stored-up impressions within the mind and the gunas fall away forever, and finally to g) when the state of eternal existence in union with the Atman is reached. Swami Prabhavananda in connection with Yoga Sutra II.50 tells us that Prana is the vital energy by which we live and all the powers of the body and all the functions of the senses  and the mind are expressions of the force of Prana; when the Kundalini is aroused it produces various degrees of enlightenment experienced by the experiencer at seven centers  – according to Raja yoga when the mind is attached to worldliness, when it dwells in three lower centers, it has no higher spiritual ambitions or visions and stays immersed in the cravings of lust and greed; the fourth center is the heart dwelling wherein the mind makes one experience the first spiritual awakening and is filled with wonder and awe; the mind reaching the fifth center, the throat, makes one freed from ignorance and delusion; with the mind reaching the sixth center, the forehead, there is the direct vision of the Lord; and when the mind reaches the seventh center at the top of the head, Samadhi is attained. These are the seven gradual yogic experiences.

Implication
In response to his query – "Which is the deity who experiences dream?" – Surya was told - अत्रैष देवः स्वप्ने महिमानमनुभवति – "In the dream state the deity, the mind, experiences greatness (consisting in assuming diverse forms of subject and object)" (Prasna Upanishad IV.5); the mind is the instrument of the perceiver in the matter of experiencing greatness, and Sankara explains that the individual soul conditioned by the mind only appears to experience things in its wakefulness and in the dream-state. The body and senses depend on ignorance, desire, and the result of past actions, when these become quiet the nature of the Self becomes non-dual, auspicious and calm.

The common experience of Duality, which contains truth and untruth, is produced by the power of illusion (Maya), it is only through religious activities that are features of duality – based experiences that the understanding and attainment of the supreme non-dual becomes possible. Gaudapada and Sankara relate māyā to the Vedic metaphor of hidden (gūdha) Brahman (Katha Upanishad (I.iii.12)). Gaudapada shows that it is only the existent that can appear, the non-existent cannot appear. Sankara tells us that the common experience depends on adhyasa (cognition of 'that' in 'not-that'), on something superimposed, and which is a transcendental error or avidya. Dvaita in whatever form is perceived by the mind, duality ceases when the mind ceases to exist and function as the mind. And, Sankara concedes that the Samadhi  experience ('Transcendental Consciousness'), which describes the state devoid of cognitive functioning, will not be established, if the phenomenal self is not considered distinct from the cognitive faculty which faculty cannot be an agent. Sankara insists:

सङ्घातोऽपि तथा नाहमिति दृश्यविलक्षणम् |
दृष्टारमनुमानेन निपुणं सम्प्रधारय ||

"Similarly be sure that you are not the complex of the gross and the subtle-bodies, and intelligently determine, by inference, that you, the ‘seer’, are entirely distinct from the seen" (Vakya Vritti.Sl. 17)

which means that a person should firmly ascertain that in himself he is something other than the gross and the subtle bodies. In his commentary on this statement, Swami Chinmayananda tells us that the misapprehension that the products of matter, such as body, mind and intellect, are the Self, is an experience caused by the non-apprehension of the Spiritual Essence; the non-apprehension of the Supreme Self in all its supreme transcendental resplendency, generates endless misapprehensions which are to be removed by invoking knowledge, the direct apprehension of the Self. Unlike Sankara, Ramanuja does not admit a distinction between illusory perception and true perception, for he declares that even in illusory perception, so-called, there is some perception of reality. Thus all experience has its validity. The immediate intuition of God is not the highest transcendental consciousness (Turiya) but rather it is the transcendental experience of God in which there remains the ego as distinct from him.

R.D.Ranade states that the Upanishadic seers throw hints and suggest the way for realizing the Self, only too cognizant of the fact that any description of the great mystic experience by word of mouth would fall short of reality, as much as any mediate, intellectual, or expressible knowledge would fall short of immediate, intuitive, first-hand experience. There is the same gulf between the expression of an experience and the enjoyment of it, as there is between knowledge and being.

References

Conceptions of self
Hindu philosophical concepts
Subjective experience
Vedanta
Yoga concepts